Hamilton Herbert Charles James Druce (1869 – 21 June 1922) was an English entomologist who specialised in Lycaenidae and to a lesser extent Hesperiidae. He is not to be confused with his father, the English entomologist Herbert Druce (1846–1913) who also worked on Lepidoptera.

H. H. Druce was a Fellow of the Zoological Society of London and of the Entomological Society of London.
The H. H. Druce collection was sold to James John Joicey and is now in the Natural History Museum in London.

Selected works

Druce, H. H., 1890  Descriptions of twelve new species of Lycaenidae from West Africa and one from the Solomon Islands in the collection of Herbert Druce. Annals and Magazine of Natural History (6)24–31.
Druce, H. H., 1891. On the Lycaenidae of the Solomon Islands. Proc. zool. Soc. Lond. pp. 357–372, 2 pls.
Druce, H. H., 1891 Descriptions of some new Genera and Species of West-African Lycaenidae Annals and Magazine of Natural History (6) 7 (40) : 364–367
Druce, H. H., 1892. A list of the Lycaenidae of the South Pacific Islands east of the Solomon Group. Proc. zool. Soc. Lond. pp. 434–446, 1 pl.
Druce, H. H., 1895. A monograph of the Bornean Lycaenidae, Proc. Zool. Soc. Lond. 1895: 556–267, 4 pls.
Druce, H. H., 1897. Descriptions of four new species of Lycaenidae from the Eastern Archipelago. Ann. Mag. nat. Hist. (6)19: 14–16.
Druce, H. H., 1902. On some new and little-known butterflies of the family Lycaenidae from the African, Australian and Oriental Regions. Proc. zool. Soc. Lond. (II)(1): 112–121, pls. 11,12.
Druce, H. H., 1904. Descriptions of new species of Lycaenidae from Borneo and New Guinea. Ann. Mag. nat. Hist. (7)13: 140–142.
Druce, H. H. and Bethune-Baker, G. T., 1893. A monograph of the butterflies of the genus Thysonotis. Proc. zool. Soc. Lond. 3 536–552, pls. 45–47.
Druce, H.H. 1905. Descriptions of some new species of diurnal lepidoptera, collected by Mr. Harold Cookson, in Northern Rhodesia [actually in the Democratic Republic of Congo] in 1903 and 1904. Transactions of the Entomological Society of London 1905:251–262. Plate XIII 
Druce, H.H., 1909 On some new and little-known Hesperiidae from tropical west Africa. Proceedings of the Zoological Society of London 1909:406–413.   
Druce, H.H., 1910 Descriptions of new Lycaenidae and Hesperiidae from tropical West Africa. Proceedings of the Zoological Society of London 1910:356–378.

References
Musgrave, A., Bibliography of Australian Entomology 1775–1930 Sydney, 1932.

External links

ULM Partial Bibliography
African Butterfly Database List of H.H. Druce publications on African butterflies

English lepidopterists
1869 births
1922 deaths
Date of birth missing
Fellows of the Zoological Society of London
19th-century English scientists
20th-century English scientists